Khaki (also Romanized as Khākī) is a village in Nurali Rural District, in the Central District of Delfan County, Lorestan Province, Iran. At the 2006 census, its population was 44, in 13 families.

References 

Towns and villages in Delfan County